Lauri Lehtinen (born 25 March 1987 in Helsinki) is a Finnish sailor. He competed at the 2012 Summer Olympics in the 49er class.

References

External links
 
 
 

1987 births
Living people
Finnish male sailors (sport)
Olympic sailors of Finland
Sailors at the 2012 Summer Olympics – 49er
29er class sailors
Sportspeople from Helsinki